The Ticknall Tramway was a  long  gauge horse-drawn plateway terminating at Ticknall, Derbyshire, England. It operated from 1802 to 1913.

Location 
The industrial tramway connected the brickyards, lime quarries and lime yards of Ticknall to the Ashby Canal. It had branches to the quarries and lime works at Cloud Hill and to the Smoile and Lount collieries.

History
The construction and use of the tramway was permitted by an Act of Parliament of 25 May 1794. Ashby Canal Company decided on 21 August 1798, to contract Benjamin Outram, one of the founders of the Butterley Company in Derbyshire regarding the benefits of using a tramway instead of a canal. The company approved his recommendations in December 1798 and issued some notes regarding the route. In December 1799 the company concluded that it could not finance a double-track line, and built just a single-track line from Old Parks Tunnel to Ticknall but a double-track from Willesley to Old Parks. Due to the lack of liquidity, Outram threatened the company in February 1801 to stop all work if he was not paid. The company complained about Outram's workmanship and contracted Joseph Wilkes of Measham and other inspectors, to assess the line in 1802 and 1803. Their reports show the length of the completed sections as follows.

The tramway was informally taken into use between July and October 1802. It was last used on 1913 and officially closed in 1915. The tramway is recognised as "well ahead of its time" and "a milestone in transport technology and a model for the modern railway systems which followed thirty years later."

Tracks 
The L-shaped cast iron rails were cast in Benjamin Outram's foundry of the Butterly Iron works, keeping them fully occupied for 15 months. Waggons with flangeless wheels were hauled by horses.

The track was called “Outram Way”.

Bridges and tunnels 
Some of the embankments and cuts cans still be seen, as well as a bridge (The Arch) over the Main Street in Ticknall, which is still being used by farmers. It looks similar to canal bridges, is Grade II listed, as it is one of the oldest railway bridges in the world.

Two   cut and cover tunnels are well preserved in Calke Park. The longer tunnel is an underpass of the main drive to Calke Abbey, the hall of the Harpur family, which is now owned by the National Trust. Stone sleeper blocks can still be seen at various points along the route.

Operation 
Benjamin Outram planned to use two horses to haul a train in the flat area, and support these by a third horse on the uphill section from Ticknall to the top of Pistern Hill. The support horse was to be led back by a boy four times a day, to support the uphill run of other trains. Consequently, four men, one boy and nine horses were required to transport 40 tons of stones from Ticknall to the Ashby Canal, and on the return runs 12 tons coal, slack (coal dust) and other goods.

Literature 
Gerry Calderbank: Canal, Coal & Tramway: An Introduction to the Industrial Heritage of Mamble. L C Promotions, 2000.
Geoffrey Holt: The Ticknall Tramway. Ticknall Preservation and Historical Society, 2002. 
I. Stabb und T. Downing: The Redlake Tramway and the China Clay Industry. T. Downing, 1977.
John Stanley Webb: Black Country Tramways: Company-worked Tramways and Light Railways of the West Midlands Industrial Area: 1913–39. J. S. Webb, 1976,

External links 
 John Hudson: The Ticknall to Ashby tramway, Derbyshire, UK. YouTube video, 25 May 2018.
 Early plateway on the Ticknall Tramway, Derbyshire

References 

 

Plateway
Industrial railways in England
Tram transport
4 ft 2 in gauge railways in England
Former buildings and structures in England
Rail transport in Derbyshire
Horse-drawn railways